Roxbury Memorial High School is a defunct four-year public high school serving students in ninth through twelfth grades. Originally founded as Roxbury High School, the school was situated at 26 Townsend Street, in the Roxbury neighborhood of Boston, Massachusetts, United States from 1926 until its closure in 1960.

History
Roxbury High School (for boys) was established in 1852, in what was then the independent City of Roxbury, Massachusetts on Kenilworth Street. In 1854, Roxbury High School for Girls opened, and in 1861, both schools were united into a single co-educational school. The City of Roxbury was annexed by the City of Boston in 1868, and the administration of Roxbury High School was assumed by Boston Public Schools. In order to "abolish coeducation and the elective system in all high schools",  in 1911 the school committee voted to make the Roxbury High School exclusive to girls.

In 1926, the school moved from its second home on Warren and Montrose Streets (thereafter housing the Boston Clerical School) to a new building on Townsend Street and became known as the Memorial High School. Prior to being erected, the Townsend Street building had been named as such in 1925 by members of the Boston School Committee "in commemoration of the Boston schoolmen who lost their lives during the World War". The school building was built in two phases, a girls' portion completed with classes started for the 1926-27 school year, and a boys' half completed with classes started in September, 1928. The two halves were treated as separate institutions,  Memorial High School for  Boys and Memorial High School  for Girls, both with its own headmasters and set of teachers. The school was the first in the City of Boston to feature a swimming pool. Prior to the 1929 school year, the name of the school was changed to the Roxbury Memorial High School. The Warren Branch of the Boston Public Library (BPL) moved to the building in 1926 and was renamed the Memorial Branch. In December 1970, the branch relocated to the corner of Warren and Crawford Streets and dubbed the Grove Hall Branch of the BPL.

The school closed in 1960. The building was later occupied by Boston Technical High School from 1960 to 1987, and since 1991 by Boston Latin Academy.

Headmasters
 BOYS
 Robert B. Masterson (1928–1953)
 Paul B. Crudden† (1953–1960)
 GIRLS
 Myrtle C. Dickson (1926–1947). First woman headmaster appointed in Boston Public Schools.
 Winifred H. Nash (1947–1957)

† Headmaster for both Boys and Girls schools, 1957–1960.

Notable alumni
 Sheldon Adelson, business magnate, investor, and philanthropist
 Arthur Asa Berger, academic
 Jason Berger, painter
 John F. Collins, Mayor of Boston
Sherm Feller, Boston Red Sox public address announcer
 The G-Clefs, doo-wop/R&B vocal group
 Larry Glick, talk radio host
 Martin Grossack, psychologist
 Jerry Korn, Boston Globe reporter and author
 Jack Landrón, popular folksinger (as Jackie Washington) and actor.
 Elma Lewis, founder of the National Center of Afro-American Artists and the Elma Lewis School of Fine Arts
 Carl McCall, politician
 Albert "Dapper" O'Neil politician
 Eddie Pellagrini, Major League Baseball infielder and baseball coach at Boston College.
 Fred Richmond, politician
 Flo Steinberg, publisher
 John Woodrow Wilson, artist

References

High schools in Boston
Public high schools in Massachusetts
1852 establishments in Massachusetts
Educational institutions disestablished in 1960
Roxbury, Boston
Defunct schools in Massachusetts